The 1999 NBA Finals was the championship round of the shortened 1998–99 NBA season, and the conclusion of the season's playoffs. The Western Conference champion San Antonio Spurs took on the Eastern Conference champion New York Knicks for the title, with the Spurs holding home court advantage. The Spurs defeated the Knicks 4 games to 1 to win their first NBA championship.

Background
The 1998-1999 NBA season was shortened due to a labor dispute that led to a lockout. The owners and the National Basketball Players Association reached an agreement to end the dispute on January 20, 1999. The 1998–99 season, which began on February 5, 1999, was shortened from the usual 82-game schedule to 50 games per team.

San Antonio Spurs

The 1998–99 season was the second season of the "Twin Towers" pairing of David Robinson and star second-year forward Tim Duncan. Robinson and Duncan had been teammates since the Spurs drafted Duncan with the first overall pick in the 1997 NBA Draft. The Spurs earned this draft pick through the draft lottery due to a 62-loss 1996–97 season in which Robinson had a season-ending injury and the team collapsed. During the 1996–97 season, veteran coach Bob Hill was fired and replaced by then-general manager Gregg Popovich. In the 1997–98 season, the Spurs won 56 games, but were eliminated in the second round of the playoffs by the Utah Jazz.

In the 1998–99 season, the Spurs recovered from a 6–8 start to the season to win 31 of their last 36 games. The Spurs qualified for the playoffs as the top seed in the Western Conference and tied the Utah Jazz for the league's best regular-season record (37-13).

After defeating the Minnesota Timberwolves in four games, San Antonio recorded back-to-back sweeps in the second round and the conference finals, defeating the Los Angeles Lakers and Portland Trail Blazers. The victory over Portland gave the Spurs their first-ever trip to the NBA Finals.

New York Knicks

The Knicks had a more difficult time reaching the playoffs than the Spurs did. Toward the end of the season, with the team teetering on the brink of making the playoffs, New York fired general manager Ernie Grunfeld. The Knicks barely qualified for the playoffs and received the eighth and final seed in the Eastern Conference.

The Knicks faced the Miami Heat, the top Eastern Conference seed, in the first round. When Allan Houston made a shot with 0.8 seconds remaining in Game 5 of that series, the Knicks were victorious and became the second team in NBA history after the 1993-94 Denver Nuggets to win a playoff series as the eighth seed.

The Knicks faced the Atlanta Hawks next. Hawks center Dikembe Mutombo guaranteed a victory, but the Knicks prevailed in a four-game sweep to set up a matchup with the Indiana Pacers in the Eastern Conference Finals.

Knicks center Patrick Ewing was lost for the series after the first two games against Indiana. In the third game, with 11.9 seconds left and the Knicks trailing 91–88, the Knicks' Larry Johnson made a three-point shot while being fouled and converted the subsequent free throw for a game-winning four-point play; the victory gave the Knicks a 2–1 lead in the series. The Knicks won Game 6 and prevailed in the series.

Road to the Finals

Regular season series
The Knicks and Spurs did not play each other in the regular season.

1999 NBA Finals team rosters

San Antonio Spurs

New York Knicks

Result

The Spurs won the NBA Finals 4 games to 1. Spurs forward Tim Duncan was named the Most Valuable Player of the finals. On June 25 (two years to the day that Duncan was drafted by the Spurs), with 47 seconds to go in Game 5, Avery Johnson hit the game-winner. The Knicks scored 39 points in the second half, and Sprewell scored 25 of them, with fourteen of his points coming in the fourth quarter. However, he could not hit either of his couple of jump shots in the last half-minute of the game that could have affected the outcome. Tim Duncan scored 31 points and nine rebounds in the decisive Game 5 while averaging 27.4 points and fourteen rebounds with 2.4 assists and 2.2 blocks in the Finals.

Series summary

The Finals were played using a 2–3–2 site format, where the first two and last two games are held at the team with home court advantage. The NBA, after experimenting in the early years, restored this original format for the Finals between 1985 and 2013. In 2014, the Finals returned to a 2–2–1–1–1 site format.

Game 1

Game 2

Game 3

Game 4

Game 5

Player statistics

San Antonio Spurs

|-
| align="left" |  || 4 || 0 || 6.0 || .800 || 1.000 || .000 || 0.5 || 1.0 || 0.3 || 0.0 || 2.5 
|-! style="background:#FDE910;"
| align="left" |  || 5 || 5 || 45.8 || .537 || .000 || .795 || 14.0 || 2.4 || 1.0 || 2.2 || 27.4 
|-
| align="left" |  || 5 || 5 || 35.0 || .447 || .308 || .870 || 4.0 || 2.6 || 1.2 || 0.0 || 11.6 
|-
| align="left" |  || 5 || 5 || 36.2 || .333 || .278 || .636 || 3.0 || 3.0 || 0.8 || 0.2 || 8.0
|-
| align="left" |  || 5 || 0 || 19.2 || .324 || .375 || .000 || 1.4 || 1.0 || 1.0 || 0.0 || 6.6 
|-
| align="left" |  || 5 || 5 || 39.2 || .500 || .000 || .600 || 2.6 || 7.2 || 0.6 || 0.0 || 9.2 
|-
| align="left" |  || 5 || 0 || 8.8 || .400 || .500 || .000 || 1.0 || 0.4 || 0.0 || 0.0 || 1.8 
|-
| align="left" |  || 2 || 0 || 2.0 || 1.000 || .000 || .000 || 0.0 || 0.0 || 0.0 || 0.0 || 1.0 
|-
| align="left" |  || 2 || 0 || 1.0 || .000 || .000 || .000 || 0.0 || 0.0 || 0.0 || 0.0 || 0.0 
|-
| align="left" |  || 5 || 5 || 37.0 || .424 || .000 || .688 || 11.8 || 2.4 || 1.0 || 3.0 || 16.6 
|-
| align="left" |  || 5 || 0 || 12.8 || .200 || .000 || .500 || 2.4 || 0.4 || 0.6 || 0.4 || 1.2 

New York Knicks

|-
| align="left" |  || 1 || 0 || 1.0 || .001 || .000 || .000 || 0.0 || 0.0 || 0.0 || 0.0 || 0.0
|-
| align="left" |  || 5 || 3 || 27.0 || .500 || .000 || .750 || 7.8 || 0.2 || 0.6 || 2.0 || 9.6 
|-
| align="left" |  || 5 || 0 || 21.0 || .227 || .200 || .500 || 1.2 || 2.2 || 0.4 || 0.0 || 2.4 
|-
| align="left" |  || 5 || 2 || 15.6 || .250 || .000 || .333 || 3.8 || 0.2 || 0.2 || 0.6 || 1.2 
|-
| align="left" |  || 5 || 5 || 44.4 || .427 || .167 || .923 || 3.2 || 3.4 || 0.4 || 0.0 || 21.6 
|-
| align="left" |  || 5 || 5 || 37.0 || .286 || .111 || .615 || 4.8 || 1.4 || 1.2 || 0.2 || 7.6 
|-
| align="left" |  || 5 || 5 || 44.2 || .410 || .286 || .842 || 6.6 || 2.6 || 1.4 || 0.2 || 26.0 
|-
| align="left" |  || 5 || 0 || 21.0 || .344 || .000 || .600 || 7.6 || 0.4 || 1.2 || 0.0 || 5.6 
|-
| align="left" |  || 5 || 5 || 29.0 || .462 || .333 || .500 || 3.2 || 3.6 || 2.6 || 0.4 || 5.8
|-
| align="left" |  || 2 || 0 || 1.5 || .000 || .000 || .000 || 0.0 || 0.0 || 0.0 || 0.0 || 0.0

Broadcasting
The 1999 NBA Finals was aired in the United States on NBC, with Bob Costas and Doug Collins on play-by-play and color commentary respectively. Hannah Storm served as the studio host while Isiah Thomas, Bill Walton and Peter Vecsey served as studio analysts. Ahmad Rashad and Jim Gray served as sideline reporters.

Locally, the Finals also marked the comeback of Marv Albert following his infamous sex scandal two years prior. Albert served as the Knicks' radio play-by-play announcer on WFAN with long-time partner John Andariese. NBC Sports rehired Albert shortly after and he eventually returned to the lead play-by-play role in 2000.

Aftermath
In 2000, the Spurs became the first NBA champion since the 1985–86 Celtics to fail to win a second consecutive title. The Spurs won 53 games in the 1999–2000 season, but were severely impaired by Sean Elliott's early season kidney transplant and Tim Duncan's late-season knee injury. The Spurs were eliminated in the first round of the 2000 NBA Playoffs by the Phoenix Suns. The team went on to win NBA titles in 2003, 2005, 2007 and 2014.

, the 1999 NBA Finals remains the Knicks' last NBA Finals appearance. The following season, the Knicks won fifty games but fell to the Indiana Pacers in six games in the Eastern Conference Finals. After that season, the Patrick Ewing era came to an end when Ewing was traded to the SuperSonics. Over the fifteen ensuing post-Ewing seasons, the Knicks have been among the least successful NBA franchises, with only three winning seasons and one playoff series win.

See also
1999 NBA Playoffs

References

External links
NBA History

National Basketball Association Finals
Finals
NBA
NBA
NBA Finals
NBA Finals
20th century in San Antonio
NBA Finals
Basketball competitions in New York City
Basketball competitions in San Antonio
1990s in Manhattan